Devil's Punchbowl is a basin with a small lake near the summit of Grizzly Peak in Plumas County, California, southeast of Taylorsville.

In September 2021, it was near this basin where the last portion of uncontained burning in the Dixie Fire's East Zone, part of the largest non-complex wildfire in the state's history, was finally contained.

References

Lakes of California
Lakes of Plumas County, California